Doyo Lama is a megalithic site of New Guinea. It is placed on a hill near the Lake Sentani, at the north-west; in Jayapura Regency, Papua, Indonesia.
There are also petroglyphs.

References

External links 
 Art of the South Seas under direction of Douglas NEWTON ; p. 180.

Landforms of Papua (province)
Megalithic monuments
Archaeological sites in Indonesia